Whose Vote Counts, Explained is a 2020 docuseries. The series is narrated by Leonardo DiCaprio, Selena Gomez, and John Legend.

Episodes

Release 
Whose Vote Counts, Explained was released on September 28, 2020, on Netflix.

References

External links
 
 

2020 American television series debuts
2020 American television series endings
2020s American documentary television series
American television spin-offs
English-language Netflix original programming
Netflix original documentary television series
Vox Media